Tamara Andreevna Tyshkevich (31 March 1931 – 27 December 1997) was a Soviet shot putter. She won an Olympic gold medal in 1956 and placed fourth in 1952, losing to her long-term rival Galina Zybina. At the European championships she won a bronze medal in 1954 and a silver in 1958.

Tyshkevich was born in Belarus. During World War II her family fled to Saint Petersburg, Russia, where she spent most of her life. She took up athletics in 1947 and retired in 1962, becoming an athletics coach.

References

1931 births
1997 deaths
Soviet female shot putters
Athletes (track and field) at the 1952 Summer Olympics
Athletes (track and field) at the 1956 Summer Olympics
Olympic athletes of the Soviet Union
Olympic gold medalists for the Soviet Union
Belarusian female shot putters
Sportspeople from Vitebsk
European Athletics Championships medalists
Medalists at the 1956 Summer Olympics
Olympic gold medalists in athletics (track and field)